The 2021 CAF Women's Champions League, known as the 2021 TotalEnergies CAF Women's Champions League for sponsorship purposes, was the inaugural edition of the annual African women's association football club tournament organized by CAF. It was held in Cairo, Egypt from 5 to 19 November 2021.

Qualified Teams

The qualification phases were made up of 6 sub-confederation qualification tournaments which began with those of UNAF for North Africa and West Africa's Zone A on 24 July 2021 and concluded on 8 September 2021. Qualification ended with the participating teams reduced to the final 8 which were made up of one winning team each from the 6 CAF sub-confederations (WAFU is split into two zones), the host nation's league-winning team and, for this edition only, an additional team from the sub-confederation of the incumbent Women's Africa Cup of Nations champions.

Draw
The draw for this edition of the tournament was held at the CAF headquarters in Cairo, Egypt on 29 September 2021 at 17:00 CAT (15:00 UTC). The eight confirmed teams were put into two groups of four teams. As club competition hosts, Wadi Degla was allocated to position A1.

Venues
This edition of the tournament was held in two venues in Cairo; the 30 June Stadium and the Al Salam Stadium.

Match officials
The following sets of referees were chosen for the tournament;

Referees

Assistant referees

Group stage
The group stage kick-off times were in Central Africa Time (CAT) (UTC+02:00). Owing to the COVID-19 pandemic and its associated travel restrictions, the matches were played behind closed doors.

Group A

Group B

Knock-out phase

Bracket

Semi-finals

Third-place match

Final

Statistics

Top scorers 
Below is the list of the top 10 scorers in the main phase of this edition of the tournament:

Squad of the group stage
The CAF Women's Champions League technical study group selected the following 11 players as the squad of the group stage:

Best XI

Awards of the group stage
The CAF Women's Champions League technical study group selected the following as the best of the group stage:

Squad of the tournament
The CAF Women's Champions League technical study group selected the following 11 players as the squad of this edition of the tournament.

Best XI

Awards of the tournament
The CAF Women's Champions League technical study group selected the following as the best of the tournament.

Final standings
Per statistical convention in football, matches decided in extra time are counted as wins and losses, while matches decided by a penalty shoot-out are counted as draws.

 

|-
| colspan="11"| Eliminated in group stage
|-

 
|}

References

External links

2021 CAF Women's Champions League
2020–21 in African football
November 2021 sports events in Africa